Heilbronn is a city in Germany (not to be confused with Heilsbronn).

Heilbronn may also refer to:
 Heilbronn (district), surrounding the city of Heilbronn, Germany
 FC Heilbronn, a German football club based in Heilbronn, Germany
 Hans Heilbronn (1908–1975), German-Jewish mathematician
 Heilbronn Institute for Mathematical Research, University of Bristol, England
 Johann Faber of Heilbronn (1504–1558), controversial German Catholic preacher
 Joseph Heilbronn, German Hebrew scholar

See also
 Heilbron, Free State province of South Africa
 Heilbronn League, an alliance during the Thirty Years' War
 Heilbronn triangle problem, a mathematical question in the area of irregularities of distribution
 Heilbronner, a surname

German-language surnames
Jewish surnames
Yiddish-language surnames